WGRN may refer to:

 WGRN (FM), a radio station (89.5 FM) licensed to serve Greenville, Illinois, United States
 WGRN-LP, a low-power radio station (94.1 FM) licensed to serve Columbus, Ohio, United States